Polushkino is a rural locality (a village) in Komyanskoye Rural Settlement, Gryazovetsky District, Vologda Oblast, Russia. The population was 13 as of 2002.

Geography 
Polushkino is located 46 km northeast of Gryazovets (the district's administrative centre) by road. Pritykino is the nearest rural locality.

References 

Rural localities in Gryazovetsky District